Randy Walker is a former punter in the National Football League. He was drafted in the twelfth round of the 1974 NFL Draft by the Green Bay Packers and played that season with the team.

References

Players of American football from Shreveport, Louisiana
Green Bay Packers players
American football punters
Northwestern State Demons football players
1951 births
Living people
Sportspeople from Bossier City, Louisiana